David Carey Woll Jr. (born 1965) is an American lawyer who is a former nominee to be a United States district judge of the United States District Court for the Eastern District of New York.

Education 

Woll earned his Bachelor of Arts, magna cum laude, from University of Maryland in 1987 and his Juris Doctor from the University of Virginia School of Law in 1990.

Career 

Prior to joining the United States Department of Housing and Urban Development in 2017, Woll served as a Senior Counsel for the Public Company Accounting Oversight Board, an Assistant United States Attorney in the United States Attorney's Offices for the Eastern District of New York, and the District of Columbia, Counsel to the United States Deputy Attorney General, and as a Senior Counsel at the United States Securities and Exchange Commission. Since 2017, he has been serving as the Principal Deputy Assistant Secretary for Community Planning and Development at the U.S. Department of Housing and Urban Development. Woll has been admitted to practice law in Georgia, Maryland and the District of Columbia.

Expired nomination to district court 

On August 12, 2020, President Trump announced his intent to nominate Woll to serve as a United States district judge for the United States District Court for the Eastern District of New York. On September 8, 2020, his nomination was sent to the Senate. President Trump nominated Woll to the seat vacated by Judge Dora Irizarry who took senior status on January 26, 2020. On January 3, 2021, his nomination was returned to the President under Rule XXXI, Paragraph 6 of the United States Senate.

References

External links 

Living people
Place of birth missing (living people)
21st-century American lawyers
Assistant United States Attorneys
Georgia (U.S. state) lawyers
Lawyers from Washington, D.C.
Maryland lawyers
New York (state) Republicans
United States Department of Housing and Urban Development officials
United States Department of Justice lawyers
U.S. Securities and Exchange Commission personnel
University System of Maryland alumni
University of Virginia School of Law alumni
1965 births